Yuliseny Soria Baró (born 8 August 1979 in Havana) is a Cuban former basketball player who competed in the 2000 Summer Olympics.

References

External link
 

1979 births
Living people
Cuban women's basketball players
Olympic basketball players of Cuba
Basketball players at the 2000 Summer Olympics
Basketball players from Havana